Grayson Springs is an unincorporated community in Grayson County, Kentucky, United States.

In the 19th century, Grayson Springs contained a destination spa on its mineral springs.

References

Unincorporated communities in Grayson County, Kentucky
Unincorporated communities in Kentucky